The 2005 season was the 2nd season of competitive football by Universidad San Martín de Porres.

Statistics

Appearances and goals

Competition Overload

Primera División Peruana 2005

Apertura 2005

Clausura 2005

Pre-season friendlies

Transfers

In

Out

External links 
 Everything about Deportivo Universidad San Martín
 Deportivo Universidad San Martín de Porres – season 2005

2005
2005 in Peruvian football